Čačak Airfield ( / Aerodrom Čačak) , also known as Preljina Airfield ( / Aerodrom Preljina) or Ravan Airfield ( / Aerodrom Ravan), is a reacreational aerodrome situated in the vicinity of the hippodrome in Čačak, Serbia. Ravan is a sports airfield A1 class. The field boasts a runway measuring 600 x 60 metres, club house, a hangar for storing techniques, as well as air traffic control tower 16 meters high. From this field once operated Aero Club Čačak, and today it is Čačanski Aero Club Finesse, center for pilot training on light motor airplanes and motorgliders.  Every year, the local Aero Meeting takes place here.

References

Airports in Serbia